Stergios Paraskevas (born 11 February 2001) is a Greek professional footballer who plays as a right-back for Super League 2 club Almopos Aridea.

References

2001 births
Living people
Greek footballers
Football League (Greece) players
Super League Greece 2 players
Doxa Drama F.C. players
Almopos Aridea F.C. players
Association football fullbacks
Footballers from Drama, Greece